Antoine Corriveau (born 1985) is a Canadian folk rock singer-songwriter and author from Quebec. He is most noted for his 2014 song "Le Nouveau vocabulaire", which won the French division of the SOCAN Songwriting Prize in 2015, and his 2016 album Cette chose qui cognait au creux de sa poitrine sans vouloir s'arrêter, which was longlisted for the 2017 Polaris Music Prize.

Discography
 Entre quatre murs (2008)
 Ni Vu Ni Connu (2009)
 Saint-Maurice/Logan (2011)
 Les Ombres Longues (2014)
 Cette chose qui cognait au creux de sa poitrine sans vouloir s'arrêter (2016)
 Feu de forêt (2018)

References

Canadian male singer-songwriters
Canadian singer-songwriters
Canadian folk rock musicians
Canadian rock singers
French-language singers of Canada
French Quebecers
Singers from Quebec
Living people
21st-century Canadian male singers
1985 births